Mount Meru University (MMU) is a private university in Arusha, Tanzania. It was founded in 1962 as International Baptist Theological Seminary of Eastern Africa (IBTSEA). It is owned by the Baptist Churches of East Africa. It became an accredited university in 2005.

References

External links
 
 MMU Brochure

Private universities in Tanzania
Universities in Arusha
Educational institutions established in 2005
Buildings and structures in Arusha
2005 establishments in Tanzania